The Apex Eco 6 is the first of a family of Czech single and two seat flying wing ultralight trikes that were designed and produced by To-Mi Aviation and later by Apex Aviation. The aircraft were supplied as kits for amateur construction.

Design and development
It features a cable-braced hang glider-style high-wing, weight-shift controls, a single-seat, open cockpit, tricycle landing gear and a single engine in pusher configuration.

The aircraft is made from bolted-together aluminum tubing with steel brackets, with its single surface wing covered in Dacron sailcloth. Its  span wing is supported by a single tube-type kingpost and uses an "A" frame control bar. The Eco 6 had a factory option of a Galaxy ballistic parachute. The standard engine supplied was the  Rotax 447.

Developed from the Eco 6 were two two-seat models, the Dolphin 3 and the Cross 5. The three aircraft line commenced production in the mid-1980s and was introduced into the United States in 1997, represented in the US by AKS of Portland, Oregon.

Operational history
The Cross 5 model was supplied to the Czech Air Force.

Variants
Eco 6
Fifteen had been completed and flown by February 2000.
Dolphin 3
Cross 5
Can accept any engine under  in weight, including the  Zanzottera MZ 201. Fifteen had been completed and flown by February 2000. Construction time from the kit was reported as 100 hours.
Cross 5x
Version of the Cross 5 with higher and wider seats

Specifications (Eco 6)

References

1980s Czechoslovakian ultralight aircraft
Homebuilt aircraft
Single-engined pusher aircraft
Ultralight trikes